Masen, the Moroccan Agency for Solar Energy, is a privately owned Moroccan company with public funding. It was created in 2010 to lead the Moroccan solar project to generate electricity from solar power by installing a minimum capacity of 2,000 MW by 2020 (the Noor Plan).

In 2016, Masen became the Moroccan Agency for Sustainable Energy. Its remit was extended to all renewable energy sources (chiefly solar, wind and hydropower) and its goal is to achieve a minimum installed capacity of 3,000 MW by 2020 and 6,000 MW by 2030.

Masen develops integrated energy projects (renewables installations) under an agreement between the Moroccan state and Masen.

Deployment of the Noor project 

The Noor plan, led by Masen, aims to develop a minimum capacity of 2,000 MW of solar power by 2020 (equivalent to 14 per cent of Morocco's total installed electricity capacity by this date).

The Noor plan's first multi-technology megaproject, gathering four power plants with a total capacity of more than 580 MW, is being rolled out in the region of Ouarzazate, a city in south-east Morocco:

 Noor Ouarzazate I (160 MW): concentrating solar power plant with parabolic troughs. The project was inaugurated in February 2016 and is already operational
 Noor Ouarzazate II (200 MW):  concentrating solar power plant with parabolic troughs. Work officially began in February 2016 and delivery is scheduled for late 2017.
 Noor Ouarzazate III (150 MW):  concentrating solar power tower plant. Work officially began in February 2016 and delivery is scheduled for late 2018.
 Noor Ouarzazate IV (72 MW): photovoltaic solar power plant. A call for proposals was issued in 2015.

Noor Ouarzazate is set to be the largest solar complex in the world.

Further sites have been identified for integrated solar projects: Laâyoune, Boujdour, Midelt and Tafilalet

Activities

Wind power 
10 wind farms, including private projects, have been installed along Morocco's coastline and inland: Tarfaya, Essaouira, Laâyoun, Tetouan, Tangier, Ksar Sghir (between Tangier and Tétouan), Akhfennir, Taza, Midelt, Oualidia (2 x 18 MW) and Boujdour.

By the end of 2016, installed wind capacity stood at 895 MW.

Hydropower 
Thanks to its damming policy, Morocco now has 148 dams all over the Kingdom.

Current installed electrical power is 1,770 MW and the aim is to increase this to 2,000 MW by 2020.

Other opportunities 
Masen intends to develop other types of renewable energy if they prove relevant for Morocco.

References

Energy companies of Morocco